Syed Farid Alatas is a Malaysian author and educator, serving as a professor in the Department of Sociology at the National University of Singapore.

Books
 Ibn Khaldun (Makers of Islamic Civilization), Delhi: Oxford University Press, 2013
 Applying Ibn Khaldun: The Recovery of a Lost Tradition in Sociology (Routledge), 2014
 An Islamic Perspective on the Commitment to Inter-Religious Dialogue, Institute of Advanced Islamic Studies Malaysia, 2008
 Alternative Discourses in Asian Social Science: Responses to Eurocentrism, Delhi: Sage, 2006
 Democracy and Authoritarianism in Indonesia and Malaysia: The Rise of the Post-Colonial State, (Macmillan, 1997
 The post-colonial state: Dual functions in the public sphere (Department of Sociology working papers), National University of Singapore, 1994
 Asian Inter-Faith Dialogue: Perspectives on Religion, Education and Social Cohesion (edited) (Centre for Research on Islamic and Malay Affairs, 2003) 
 Asian Anthropology, edited with Jan van Bremen and Eyal Ben-Ari (Routledge, 2005)

References

External links
 
 Goodreads

Living people
Malaysian people of Yemeni descent
Hadhrami people
Malaysian sociologists
Academic staff of the University of Malaya
Academic staff of the National University of Singapore
Johns Hopkins University alumni
Sociologists of religion
Year of birth missing (living people)